Dollar Dreams is a 2000 Indian drama film written, directed and produced by Sekhar Kammula. Primarily shot in Telugu and English, the film starred Santosh Kumar, Anish Kuruvilla, Ravi Raju, Anil Prashant,  Dashveer Singh, Priyanka Veer, and Satya. The film was screened at the 33rd International Film Festival of India. It won the National Film Award for Best First Film of a Director at the 47th National Film Awards.

Accolades
Dollar Dreams garnered the National Film Award for Best First Film of a Director for its "taking in a very natural manner the burning problem of brain drain to the technologically developed world" as cited by the jury at the 47th National Film Awards.

Reddiff.com cited Dollar Dreams as a take off from where Hyderabad Blues ends. Dollar Dreams explores the conflict between American dreams and human feelings. The film re-introduced social realism to Telugu screen.

Cast
 Santosh Kumar as Balu
 Anish Kuruvilla as Srinu
 Ravi Raju as  Ravi
 Dr. Anil Prashant as Phani
 Dashveer Singh as  Sardar
 Priyanka Veer as Usha
 Satya as Archana
 Manasa as She
 Gopal Krishna as Father
 Radha Krishna as Lakshmi
 Kushnaaz as Kamal
Sekhar Kammula  (cameo appearance)

References

External links 

 

2000 films
2000 drama films
2000 multilingual films
Indian multilingual films
2000s Telugu-language films
Indian drama films
Films about Indian Americans
English-language Indian films
Films about immigration to the United States
Indian independent films
Films directed by Sekhar Kammula
Best Debut Feature Film of a Director National Film Award winners
2000 directorial debut films